Protect Our Kids is a political action committee (PAC) created to oppose legalization of cannabis in the United States in 2022. A so-called super PAC, Protect Our Kids is permitted to raise and spend unlimited amounts of corporate, union, and individual campaign contributions under the terms of the Citizens United Supreme Court decision.

Protect Our Kids was created by Smart Approaches to Marijuana, a nonprofit anti-cannabis political organization, in March 2022 before the mid-term elections and the House vote on the MORE Act (federal legalization). One of the first actions of the PAC was to oppose the re-election of Republican U.S. Representative Nancy Mace, who had introduced the States Reform Act that would remove cannabis from Schedule I of the Controlled Substances Act (known as de-scheduling).

The organization funding of lawsuits failed to remove the 2022 Missouri marijuana legalization initiative from the November ballot in Missouri, after it was certified by Secretary of State Jay Ashcroft. Despite the spending by the Protect Our Kids PAC, the people of Missouri voted to approve recreational cannabis on November 8, 2022.

See also 

 Cannabis in the United States
 Legality of cannabis by U.S. jurisdiction

References

Further reading 

2022 establishments in the United States
United States political action committees